BSS may stand for:

Computing and telecommunications 
 .bss ("Block Started by Symbol"), in compilers and linkers
 Base station subsystem, in mobile telephone networks
 Basic Service Set, the basic building block of a wireless local area network (WLAN)
 Boeing Satellite Systems, see Boeing Satellite Development Center
 Blum–Shub–Smale machine, a model of computation
 Broadcasting Satellite Service, in television
 Broadcasting System of San-in, Japanese TV station broadcast
 Business support system, components used by Telecom Service Providers

Entertainment 
 Best Selling Secrets, a sitcom
BSS 01, a dedicated first-generation home video game console
 Brain Salad Surgery, a 1973 Emerson, Lake & Palmer album
 Brave Saint Saturn, an American Christian rock band
 Broken Social Scene, a Canadian indie rock band
 Buraka Som Sistema, an electronic dance music project from Portugal
 Beyond Scared Straight, an A&E television series based on the 1978 film Scared Straight!
 British Strong Style, a professional wrestling group
 BooSeokSoon, a sub-unit of the K-pop group Seventeen, comprising members Hoshi, DK, and Seungkwan

Media 
 Bangladesh Sangbad Sangstha, the official news agency of Bangladesh
 Budavári Schönherz Stúdió, an online television and radio station of BUTE

Medicine
 Bismuth subsalicylate, the active ingredient in several medications
 Bernard–Soulier syndrome, a bleeding disorder
 Bristol stool scale, a medical aid designed to classify the form of human faeces
 Balanced salt solution
 British Sleep Society, a charity that represents sleep health and sleep medicine

Organizations 
 Bevara Sverige Svenskt, a Swedish racist movement
 Biciklisticki Savez Srbije, the cycling federation of Serbia
 Botanical Society of Scotland, the national learning society for botanists of Scotland

Schools 
 Bayridge Secondary School, Canada
 Bayview Secondary School, Canada
 Beaconhouse School System, Pakistan
 Bishop Strachan School, Canada
 Blessed Sacrament School (disambiguation)
 Bramalea Secondary School, Canada
 Brighton Secondary School, Australia
 Bombay Scottish School, Mahim, India

Other uses
Bally Sports South, American regional sports network owned and operated by Bally Sports
 British Supersport Championship
 Bachelor of Social Science, an  academic degree in social science awarded by a university
 Bang senseless, a gene of Drosophila melanogaster
 Basic Surgical Skills, a mandatory 3-day practical course provided by the Royal College of Surgeons for all trainee surgeons in the UK and Ireland
 Baudhayana Shrauta Sutra, a Hindu text
 Blind signal separation, a method for the separation of a set of signals in math and statistics
 Blue Shirts Society, a Fascist clique and secret police or para-military force in the Republic of China between 1931 and 1938
 Broad Street railway station (England)
 Broad Street Subway, alternative name for the Broad Street Line, a rapid transit line in Philadelphia 
 BSS Industrial, a British group of companies in the engineering sector